The Kebbi State University of Science and Technology (KSUSTA) is a state-owned university in Aliero, Kebbi State, Nigeria. KSUSTA offers programmes in agriculture and sciences, among others. It was the 79th university in Nigeria

History 
Kebbi State University of Science and Technology was established in 2006.

References

External links 
 

Universities and colleges in Nigeria
Kebbi State
Educational institutions established in 2006
2006 establishments in Nigeria